Saint Vincent Tied to a Column is a painting attributed to Portuguese Renaissance artist Nuno Gonçalves, created c. 1470-1480. It is held at the National Museum of Ancient Art, in Lisbon.

References
IMC-IP São Vicente Atado à Coluna de Nuno Gonçalves

1470s paintings
1480s paintings
Paintings by Nuno Gonçalves
Paintings in the collection of the National Museum of Ancient Art
Paintings of saints